Megf8 also known as Multiple Epidermal Growth Factor-like Domains 8, is a protein coding gene that encodes a single pass membrane protein, known to participate in developmental regulation and cellular communication. It is located on chromosome 19 at the 49th open reading frame in humans (19q13.2). There are two isoform constructs known for MEGF8, which differ by a 67 amino acid indel. The isoform 2 splice version (analyzed throughout this page) is 2785 amino acids long, and predicted to be 296.6 kdal in mass. Isoform 1 is composed of 2845 amino acids and predicted to weigh 303.1 kdal.  Using BLAST searches, orthologs were found primarily in mammals, but MEGF8 is also conserved in invertebrates and fishes, and rarely in birds, reptiles, and amphibians.  A notably important paralog to multiple epidermal growth factor-like domains 8 is ATRNL1 (Attractin-like 1), which is also a single pass transmembrane protein, with several of the same key features and motifs as MEGF8, as indicated by Simple Modular Architecture Research Tool  (SMART) which is hosted by the European Molecular Biology Laboratory located in Heidelberg, Germany. MEGF8 has been predicted to be a key player in several developmental processes, such as left-right patterning and limb formation. Currently, researchers have found MEGF8 SNP mutations to be the cause of Carpenter syndrome subtype 2.

Gene

Evolution & Orthologs
A fairly highly conserved protein, MEGF8 has conserved orthologs from P. paniscus to N. vectensis. Orthologs are found in mammals, amphibians, fish, insects, crustaceans, and invertebrates. Organization of the data showed that as time since divergence between humans and orthologs increased, the sequence identity decreased.

Paralogs
MEGF8 has one known paralog: ATRNL1. The ATRNL1 protein is approximately half the length of MEGF8, and contains several of the same conserved domains, including the CUB domain and transmembrane sequence. It is key to note that ATRNL1 is found in many birds and amphibians, where MEGF8 is not found in any birds, and only one amphibian.

Promoters
Genomatix's ElDorado (http://www.genomatix.de/), a gene promoter database, predicted ten different possible promoters for megf8. The promoter having promoter ID number GXP_1262882 and transcript ID GXT_22531930, was predicted with the highest confidence. This promoter is located on the plus strand of chromosome 19, ranging from nucleotide 42829077 to 42830497, making it a 1421 nucleotide long sequence. The promoter sequence overlaps with the transcriptional start codon in the gene.

Transcription Factors
More than one hundred transcription factor binding sites were predicted to be found in the megf8 promoter region through Genomatix. The top twenty most confidently predicted factors include the following:

Protein Architecture

Primary Structure

MEGF8 is composed of either 2845 amino acids (Isoform 1) or 2778 amino acids (Isoform 2). Isoform 2 undergoes a 67 amino acid removal from 700-766, which accounts for its shortened length; otherwise, the two isoforms are identical. Using SAPS, a Statistical Analysis of Protein Sequence  software, amino acid bias was able to be determined. Isoform one is rich in cysteine and glycine, and deficient in isoleucine and lysine. Isoform 2 of MEGF8 was found to have very high levels of cysteine, moderately high levels of glycine, and low levels of isoleucine and lysine.
The high levels of cysteine residues contributes to the numerous disulfide bonds found in the mature protein's folded structure. Overall, MEGF8 has a pH between 6.4 and 7.0, depending on the organism's sequence. Human MEGF8's pH is 6.4. This nearly neutral pH enables the protein to fold properly and inhibits denaturation. The twenty most conserved amino acids, found through a multiple sequence alignment of 20 orthologs, were found to be located in the CUB and transmembrane domains.

Secondary Structure

Prediction software PELE from UCSC Biology Workbench indicated that MEGF8 is primarily composed of beta-folded sheets, with occasional short alpha helix segments. PELE uses eight different prediction programs to compare and confirm predictions, enhancing the confidence level. The beta-folded sheets occur at many of the key domains, including the EGF-domains, kelch domains, and EGF-laminin domains. This information from PELE also corresponded with the secondary structure and 3D structure predictions made by PHYRE2

Predicted Key Domains & Features 

MEGF8 is predicted to contain several different types of features, domains, and motifs that play a key role in the protein's function, structure, and location. These are listed in Table 1. Functions, found through SMART analysis, as well as NCBI Conserved Domains Search include:
CUB domain: extracellular domain: present in proteins mostly known to be involved in development.
Epidermal Growth Factor Domain: a short peptide with a distinctive motif of six cysteines, which is found in many different proteins of diverse functions
EGF-like domain: contains several sub-families of different functions according to location and protein; not specified for MEGF8. 
Calcium EGF-like domain: Calcium-binding EGF-like domain, present in a large number of membrane-bound and extracellular (mostly animal) proteins. Many of these proteins require calcium for their biological function and calcium-binding sites have been found to be located at the N-terminus of particular EGF-like domains.
Kelch motif: Galactose oxidase, central domain; Found to cause formation of ß propeller tertiary structure of the protein.
Leucine Zipper: A motif found in regulatory proteins, as  predicted by PSORT II
Laminin EGF-like domain: laminins are the major noncollagenous components of basement membranes that mediate cell adhesion, growth migration, and differentiation; the laminin-type epidermal growth factor-like module occurs in tandem arrays; the domain contains 4 disulfide bonds (loops a-d) the first three resemble epidermal growth factor (EGF).
PSI domain:  domain found in plexins, semaphorins and integrins. Plexin are involved in the development of neural and epithelial tissues; semaphorins induce the collapse and paralysis of neuronal growth cones; and integrins may mediate adhesive or migratory functions of epithelial cells.

Predicted Domain & Motif Locations

Tertiary Structure
One of the key attributes of MEGF8's tertiary structure is its 7-bladed beta propeller which is formed by the kelch motif found in its D1k3ia3 structural domain, which was identified by SCOP. SCOP also indicated that the beta-propeller in MEGF8 is a member of the galactose oxidase super family. Each of the seven blades are made up of a four stranded beta-folded motifs. It is also important to note that although many phosphorylation sites are predicted at high confidence, several other topographic predictions (i.e. disulfide bonds, glycosylation, other extracellular features), do not support these predictions.

Predicted Post Translational Modifications

Expression
MEGF8 is found to be expressed at high levels in cardiac myocytes and fetal brain tissue, according to GeoProfiles, from NCBI. This GeoProfile also indicated that MEGF8 was found to be at moderate to moderately low expression levels in all other tissues examined. NCBI GeoProfile data also provided the tissue expression graph for MEGF8 in humans, which is displayed to the right, further illustrating specific sites and levels of expression

Function and Mechanisms in Cellular Processes

Molecular Function
According to BioGPS gene ontology information, MEGF8 is an active participant in receptor activity, calcium ion binding, protein binding.

Role in Biological Processes
Analysis of gene ontology information by BioGPS was able to produce a list of biological processes in each of which MEGF8 plays a significant role:

Putative Interactions
In the table below, all predicted interactions, except SMARCD3, are supported by two-hybrid screen experimental data.  This information is supported by both NextProt database and IntAct database. The two interactions with the highest confidence value are also supported by materials found by text-mining in STRING. Together, it is with reasonably high confidence that the proteins in red are interacting with MEGF8, and with moderate confidence that the proteins in green interact with MEGF8. The confidence level for the proteins in blue is much lower, which may mean that the two-hybrid assay provided a false positive, or that they actually are interacting.

Alternative Splicing, Mutations, & Phenotypic Impacts

Splice Variants
The four primary splice variants and their distinctions are described below (labels correspond to those in image below):

A: has spliced out Exon 13. Looking at the attached working conceptual translation, it can be seen that exon 3 does not code for any feature, domain, motif or other functional section of aa, and is likely therefore not key to the function of MEGF8 protein. This is the variant that corresponds to the splice model of the analyzed megf8.

B: Spliced out exons 1-6; these exons hold several key domains and motifs including the CUB domain, two PSI domains, a D1k3ia3 structural domain, and a kelch repeat. This may result in a misfolded protein without the structural segments, and inhibit participation in development events (loss of PSI and CUB). Still has signal and TMEM so may still be able to partially function

 C:  part of the D1k3ia3 structural domain remains in exon 29, but the kelch repeat has been excised, which could lead to structural issues. Also this variant contains almost 3 PSI domains, and an area of low complexity in exons 32-35, which may allow this variant to function in the cell, but no signal or TMEM to place in membrane so not a normal function

D: This variant is exons 36-40, excised 41, and a shortened 42 exon. It possesses EGF calcium domains and EGF/EGF-like domains. Loss of 41 will drastically alter the function as it possesses the TMEM segment. It depends on where 41 is lost and 42 is cleaved.

Common Mutations

SNPs

There are several SNPs, found through NCBI GeneView, that cause missense or silent mutations in MEGF8. However, three SNP mutations were identified as causes of Carpenter Syndrome 2 by Twigg et al. The three SNP mutations are: Gly199 to Arg; Arg1499 to His; Ser2367 to Gly. The article by Twigg includes a supplementary data set that shows a multiple sequence alignment of the regions surrounding the SNPs and the domain in which the SNP lies. The Gly199 to Arg mutation is located inside an EGF-domain; the Arg1499 to His mutation is located within a kelch domain in the 7-bladed beta-sheet propeller; the Ser2367 to Gly is located within an EGF-Laminin domain. These domain are important to maintaining a properly folded protein and its function.

Carpenter Syndrome 2
Visit Carpenter syndrome for more extensive details related to the disease. Genetic mutations in MEGF8 have been found to be a principal cause of this rare genetic syndrome.

Adverse Phenotypic Consequences
Mutations in MEGF8 have been found to be linked to defective lateralization during development, as reported by Twigg et al. Common features of individuals with Carpenter Syndrome Subtype II include the following:

Current Research
There is no research being done currently to develop treatment or cures for Carpenter Syndrome 2. Researchers are still striving to understand the cause of the point mutations in MEGF8 that result in this extremely rare genetic disease.

References

Further reading 

 
 
 
 
 
 

Kelch proteins